"Hvala, ne!" is a song performed by Slovenian singer Lea Sirk. The song was released as a digital download on 2 March 2018. The song was written and produced by Lea Sirk and Tomy DeClerque.

Eurovision Song Contest

The song represented Slovenia in the Eurovision Song Contest 2018 in Lisbon, Portugal. The song competed in the second semi-final, held on 10 May 2018, and qualified for the final.

Music video
Official music video directed by Perica Rai was released on 25 April 2018. It was produced by Mediaspot videos and financially supported by SAZAS. Ylenia Mahnič in Tine Ugrin starring in main roles.

Track listing

Credits and personnel
 Lea Sirk – music, lyrics, arrangement, production 
 Tomy DeClerque – music, arrangement, production

Charts

Weekly charts

Release history

References

2018 songs
Eurovision songs of 2018
Eurovision songs of Slovenia
Slovene-language songs